Newton Estape Vila (Santa Clara, 2 May 1913 - Havana, 22 November 1980) was a prominent Cuban photographer and journalist.

Estape became a journalist and photographer without any formal schooling.

Collective exhibitions
In 1946 is work was displayed as part of the Seventh Salón Nacional, Club Fotográfico de Cuba (CFC), Havana. In 1948 he was included in the I International Saloon of Artistic Photographie,  Photographic Club of Cuba.

Collections
His works can be found in collections such as Colección de la Familia Escapé, Havana. He wrote and directed the documentary Si Me Dieran Otra Vida in 1992.

References

External links
 http://imdb.com/title/tt0818622/
 http://www.cip.cu/webcip/directorios/quien_es/letra_e/estape.html
 http://lambiek.net/artists/e/estape_newton.htm
 http://www.cubacine.cu/muestrajoven/bisi/bis43a4.html
 http://www.cubacine.cu/ficcion/caballerodeparis.htm

1913 births
1980 deaths
Cuban contemporary artists
Cuban photographers
Cuban journalists
Male journalists
People from Santa Clara, Cuba
People from Havana
20th-century journalists